Love Is All You Need is a 2012 Danish film starring Pierce Brosnan and Trine Dyrholm. It may also refer to:

 Love Is All You Need? (2011 film), a 2011 short film
 Love Is All You Need? (2016 film), based on the short film
 "Love Is All You Need", a 1978 song by High Inergy
 "Love Is All You Need", a 1987 song by Sarah Cracknell
 "Love Is All You Need", a 1998 episode of Bear in the Big Blue House
 "Love Is All You Need", a 2006 episode of The Royal
 "Love Is All You Need", a song performed by Nico for the Eurovision Song Contest 2007

See also
 Love Is All We Need (disambiguation)
 All You Need Is Love (disambiguation)